Corolla ovata is a species of gastropod in the family Cymbuliidae.

References 

Cymbuliidae
Animals described in 1833